Jorge Montt Álvarez (April 26, 1845 – October 8, 1922) was a vice admiral in the Chilean Navy and president of Chile from 1891 to 1896.

Early life
Born in Casablanca, Chile, He was a nephew of previous Chilean president Manuel Montt, and a cousin of future president Pedro Montt. After graduating from the naval academy in 1861, he served in the Chincha Islands War (1864-1866) and the War of the Pacific (1879-1883). He led the 1891 Chilean Civil War against President José Manuel Balmaceda to become provisional leader and eventually president in 1891.

Presidency
The close of the revolution against Balmaceda left the government of Chile in the hands of the junta under whose guidance the military and naval operations had been organized. Admiral Jorge Montt had been the head of this revolutionary committee, and he acted as president of the provisional government when the administration of the country changed hands after the victory of the Congressional party. An election was then immediately ordered to elect the president of the republic as well as representatives in the senate and chamber of deputies. Admiral Montt, as head of the executive power, staunchly refused to allow official influence to be brought to bear in any way in the presidential campaign. The great majority of the voters, however, required no pressure to decide who was in their opinion the man most fit to administer the affairs of the republic.

An election was held, and Admiral Montt was duly chosen by a nearly unanimous vote to be chief magistrate for the remaining time of the constitutional term of five years, till September 18, 1896. The senate and chamber of deputies were formally constituted in due course, and the government of the republic resumed normal conditions of existence. The new president showed admirable tact in dealing with the difficult problem he was called upon to face. Party feeling still ran high between the partisans of the two sides of the recent conflict. Admiral Montt took the view that it was politic and just to let bygones be bygones, and he acted conscientiously by this principle in all administrative measures in connection with the supporters of the late President Balmaceda. Early in 1892, amnesty was granted to the officers of the Balmaceda regime, and they were freely permitted to return to Chile without any attempts made against them. The first political act of national importance of the new government was the granting of control to the municipalities, which hitherto had possessed little power to direct local affairs and were not even permitted to make spending decisions of the municipal revenues to any important amount without first obtaining the consent of the central government. Almost absolute power was now given these corporations to manage their own concerns, and the organization of the police was placed in their hands; at a later period, however, it was found necessary to modify this latter condition.

President Montt next turned his attention towards the question of how to best repair the damage caused to the country by eight months of civil warfare. The plan of public works authorized in 1887 was reconsidered, and the construction of portions of the various undertakings recommenced. The army and navy were reorganized. Additional instructors were brought from Germany, and all arms of the military service were placed on a thoroughly efficient footing in matters of drill and discipline. Several new and powerful cruisers were added to the navy, and the internal economy of this branch of the national defence was thoroughly inspected; many defects were remedied.

President Montt then took in hand the question of a reform of the currency, the abolition of nonconvertible paper money, and the re-establishment of a gold monetary standard for the republic. This reform of the currency became the keynote of the president's policy during the remainder of his term of office. Great opposition was raised by the representatives of the debtor class in congress to the suppression of the nonconvertible paper money, but in the end President Montt carried the day, and on February 11, 1895 a measure finally became law establishing a gold currency as the only tender in Chile. In July 1896, the Conversion Act was put in force, a dollar of 18d. being the monetary unit adopted.

In 1895, relations with the neighbouring republic of Argentina began to become somewhat strained in regard to the interpretation of the treaty concerning the boundary between the two countries. The treaties of 1881, 1893 and 1895 left doubts in the minds of both Chileans and Argentines as to the position of the frontier line. On April 17, 1896, another protocol was drawn up, by which the contending parties agreed to submit any differences to the arbitration of Great Britain, at the instance of one or both governments. President Montt had now fulfilled his term of office, and on September 18, 1896 he handed over the presidential power to his successor, Federico Errázuriz Echaurren, who had been duly elected in the month of June previously.

Post-presidency
Montt served as commander of the Chilean Navy from 1897 until his retirement in 1913. He then served as mayor of Valparaiso from 1915 to 1918.
He died in Santiago in 1922.

See also
1891 Chilean Civil War
Montt family

Notes

Further reading
 Moore, John Bassett. "The Late Chilian Controversy." Political Science Quarterly 8.3 (1893): 467-494. online

                   

1845 births
1922 deaths
People from Valparaíso Province
People from Casablanca, Chile
Chilean people of Catalan descent
Jorge Montt
Presidents of Chile
Chilean admirals
Candidates for President of Chile
Chilean Navy personnel of the War of the Pacific
People of the Chilean Civil War of 1891
19th-century Chilean Navy personnel
Chilean people of Spanish descent
Honorary Knights Grand Cross of the Order of St Michael and St George